Adolf of Nassau may refer to:

Adolf, King of Germany (c. 1255–1298), King of the Romans
Adolph I, Count of Nassau-Wiesbaden-Idstein (1307–1370)
Adolf I von Nassau (c. 1353–1390), Archbishop of Mainz
Adolf I, Count of Nassau-Siegen (1362–1420)
Adolph II, Count of Nassau-Wiesbaden-Idstein (1386–1426)
Adolph II of Nassau (1423–1475), Archbishop of Mainz
Adolf III of Nassau-Wiesbaden-Idstein (1443–1511)
Adolf IV of Nassau-Wiesbaden-Idstein (1518–1556)
Adolph, Count of Nassau-Saarbrücken (1526–1559)
Adolf of Nassau (1540–1568), brother of Louis of Nassau and William I of Orange, killed in the Battle of Heiligerlee
Adolf of Nassau-Siegen (1586–1608), son of Count John VII
Adolph, Prince of Nassau-Schaumburg (1629–1676), son of Louis Henry of Nassau-Dillenburg
Adolph, Count of Ottweiler (1789–1812)
Adolphe, Grand Duke of Luxembourg (1817–1905), Duke of Nassau and later Grand Duke of Luxembourg

See also
Adolph of Nassau-Weilburg (disambiguation)
Adolf (disambiguation)
Nassau (disambiguation)